Teresa Herrera (1712 - 1791), was a Spanish philanthropist. She was the founder of the first hospital in town, the Hospital de la Caridad in A Coruña (1791).

A street is named after her, as well as the hospital Hospital Materno Infantil Teresa Herrera, and the awards Teresa Herrera Trophy (1946), Bandera Teresa Herrera (1986) and the Trofeo Teresa Herrera (pádel) (2007) were all made in memory of her.

References 
 Correal y Freyre de Andrade, Narciso: La Coruña benéfica del siglo XVIII. Teresa Herrera. La Coruña: Ferrer, 1909.89

1712 births
1791 deaths
Spanish philanthropists
18th-century Spanish people
18th-century philanthropists
18th-century women philanthropists